TLC is the self-titled fifth studio album by American girl group TLC, released on June 30, 2017, by their label 852 Musiq. TLC partnered with various distribution companies: Sony Music RED (North America), Liberation Music (Australia), Warner Music Group (Japan), and Cooking Vinyl (the rest of the world). TLC is mainly a pop and R&B album with 1990s music influences. It is their first studio album in 15 years following the 2002 release of 3D.

The album received generally positive reviews from critics, many of whom praised the throwback sound included on the album, though some criticized the album for not living up to their legacy. The album debuted at number 38 on the Billboard 200 chart, selling 12,000 album-equivalent units in its first week, 11,000 of which were pure sales. The album also reached number 20 on the Top R&B/Hip-Hop Albums chart and number 40 on the UK Albums Chart.

TLC spawned the single "Way Back" which became their fourth Billboard Adult R&B top-10 entry, eventually peaking at number eight. "Haters" was released as the lead international single.

The UK-only deluxe edition features re-recorded versions of the singles "No Scrubs", "Creep", "Unpretty", "Baby-Baby-Baby", and "Diggin' on You". The same recordings were included in the Japan-only 2013 release TLC 20 and were used in the group's television biopic CrazySexyCool: The TLC Story.

Background
On January 19, 2015, TLC announced their plan to release what they called their "final" album with the launch of a Kickstarter campaign. They asked fans to help finance the project by donating a pledge of at least $5 to reach their goal of $150,000. In less than 48 hours, they surpassed their goal and become the "fastest most funded pop project in Kickstarter history". Among other artists who donated were New Kids on the Block (donating $10,000), Katy Perry (donating $5,000), Soulja Boy, Bette Midler and Justin Timberlake. The Kickstarter campaign raised a total of $400,000. In an interview published following the end of the campaign, Watkins and Thomas clarified that they would never split up following the release and promotion of the album, and that they would continue to perform together as TLC.

During the development of their album, Watkins and Thomas petitioned Lisa Lopes' brother Ron Lopes for assistance with making Left Eye's presence on the album a possibility since she had an abundance of unreleased material. However, they ultimately passed on using any of Lopes' archive recordings as the available source material conflicted with the sound that they were recording for the album. However, wanting to make a tribute to Lopes as a member of TLC, they settled on creating an interlude sampling portions of her interviews for the album.

Promotion
The album's lead single "Way Back" featuring Snoop Dogg was released on April 14, 2017. The single was produced by D'Mile and was released via TLC's independent label 852 Musiq which is distributed through RED Distribution in the US. The group first performed the song in London in May 2017. In the United States, the group promoted the single, album, and the I Love the 90s: The Party Continues Tour with performances on Today and Jimmy Kimmel Live!.

"Haters" was released on October 26, and on November 1, 2016, exclusively (alongside "Joy Ride") in Japan and New Zealand, respectively. The former was later re-released as the lead international single from the album on May 5, 2017.

"American Gold" and "It's Sunny" were released as promotional singles prior to the album's release. "American Gold" was announced as the second single in the United States in June 2017 by the track's songwriter Candace Wakefield. However, no such release materialized and no further singles were released from the album.

Critical reception

TLC received generally positive reviews from music critics. On Metacritic, which assigns a normalized rating out of 100 to reviews from critics, the album received an average score of 63 based on 15 reviews. Rachel Aroesti of The Guardian gave the album 4 stars out of 5, calling the album "deeply nostalgic" also stating that it "proves that their winning formula still works." Andy Kellman of AllMusic criticized the album, calling the album "more suited for Radio Disney than for the Hot 97", also targeting the song Haters, saying that it felt like it was more or so written for a teen pop girl group. In a mixed review, Felicity Martin of Clash praised their comeback single "Way Back", calling it the perfect comeback single, and praised some other songs included on the album, however, criticizing songs such as "It's Sunny" for being cheesy. In a positive review, Jim Farber of Entertainment Weekly said that the songs on the album were great, but that they did not compare to their past music. Despite this comment, he stated that they were able to move ahead in one aspect: their mature perspective of nostalgia. In another mixed review, Nick Levine of NME criticized some of the songs' cheesiness, along with criticizing some of the  songs included on the album for sounding like every other song in the R&B genre. Despite these complaints, he praised the song Scandalous, calling it a return to their former edge. In a positive review, Julianne Shepherd of Pitchfork praised the girl-power anthems included on the album, however stating that the songs do not hold up to their former glory. In another positive review, Philippa Barr of Drowned in Sound praised the dance club anthems on the album, along with the empowerment anthems. However, she criticized the cliché in the song "It's Sunny".

Commercial performance
In the United States, TLC debuted at number 38 on the Billboard 200 chart, selling 12,000 album-equivalent units, 11,000 of which were pure sales. The album spent one week on the chart, marking TLC's lowest-charting studio album, and lowest-running studio album. The album performed similarly on the UK Albums Chart when it debuted at number 40; the album charted five spots higher than 3D (2002), making it their highest charting album on the chart since FanMail (1999).

On the Scottish Albums Chart, the album debuted at number 72, spending one week on the chart. The album also managed to debut at number seven on the Recorded Music NZ Heatseeker Albums chart, where it spent one week on the chart.

Track listing

Personnel
Credits for TLC adapted from AllMusic.

 Chris Athens – mastering
 Luke Austin – keyboards
 Leslie Brathwaite – mastering, mixing
 Mike Busbee – production
 Casper & B. – production
 Bill Diggins – production
 Theodore "NoizeBeatz" Lawrence – production
 Charles Dunlap – production
 Terrence "Grad Teachem" Dunlap – vocals
 Devon Eisenberger – guitar
 Dernst Emile II – keyboards, production, programming
 Ron Fair – additional production, engineering, executive production, piano, production, vocal production
 Kevin Hellon – bass
 Debra Killings – background vocals
 Raymond Komba – keyboards, production
 Dennis Leupold – photography
 Chris Malloy – production
 Cory "Knotch" Marks – drum programming, production, programming
 Niko McKnight – guitar, production
 Cory Mo – drum programming, engineering, keyboards, mixing, production, synthesizer, vocal engineering
 Zach Nicholls – engineering, mixing, mixing engineering, vocal engineering
 Desmond Peterson – production
 David Reed – production
 Joshua "Tipz" Richardson – engineering, production
 Lucas Sader – guitars
 Peter Sharkey – programming
 Snoop Dogg – featured artist
 Gavin Taylor – creative direction, design
 Patrick Thrall – vocal engineering
 TLC – primary artist
 Desmond "Motown" Washington – production
 Carnoy "Ayo Kayo" Watkins – production
 Tionne "T-Boz" Watkins – production

Charts

Sales

Release history

References

2017 albums
Albums produced by Dunlap Exclusive
Albums produced by D'Mile
Cooking Vinyl albums
Kickstarter-funded albums
Self-released albums
TLC (group) albums